Tanner Muse (born September 6, 1996) is an American football linebacker for the Seattle Seahawks of the National Football League (NFL). He played college football at Clemson and was drafted by the Raiders in the third round of the 2020 NFL Draft.

Early life and high school
Muse grew up in Belmont, North Carolina and attended South Point High School, where he played center field on the baseball team and running back, safety, and long snapper on the football team. As a senior, Muse was named first team All-State after recording 150 tackles with four interceptions on defense while also rushing for 1,292 yards. Muse was rated a four star recruit and committed to play college football and baseball at Clemson going into his senior year over offers from Michigan, Louisville and Northwestern.

College career
Muse redshirted his true-freshman season and decided not to play baseball in order to participate in Clemson's spring practices. The following season he played in all 15 of Clemson's games as a reserve safety and on special teams, making 24 total tackles as the Tigers  won the 2016 National Championship. He became a starter as a redshirt sophomore and finished the season with 64 tackles, two tackles for loss, four passes broken up and a 63-yard fumble return for a touchdown. As a redshirt junior, he recorded 76 tackles, 2.5 tackles for loss, five pass breakups, two sacks, and two interceptions and was named third team All-Atlantic Coast Conference (ACC) as the Tigers won the 2018 National Championship. Muse was named first team All-ACC and a third team All-American by the Associated Press as a redshirt senior after recording 73 tackles, six tackles for loss, two sacks, five passes broken up and a team-leading four interceptions.

Professional career

Las Vegas Raiders
Muse was drafted by the Las Vegas Raiders in the third round with the 100th overall pick in the 2020 NFL Draft. He was placed on injured reserve on September 7, 2020, with a foot injury. Muse underwent season-ending surgery on his toe on November 3, 2020. He was placed on the reserve/COVID-19 list by the team on December 3, 2020, and moved back to injured reserve on December 22.

On September 6, 2021, Muse was waived by the Raiders without ever taking a snap for the team in the regular season.

Seattle Seahawks
On September 8, 2021, Muse was signed to the Seattle Seahawks practice squad. He was promoted to the active roster on December 15.

On August 30, 2022, Muse was waived by the Seahawks and signed to the practice squad the next day. He was signed to the active roster on September 14, 2022.

Personal
His younger brother, Nick Muse, is a tight end who played college football at South Carolina and was drafted in the 7th round (227 overall) by the Minnesota Vikings in the 2022 NFL Draft.

References

External links
Clemson Tigers bio
Las Vegas Raiders bio

1996 births
Living people
People from Belmont, North Carolina
Players of American football from North Carolina
American football linebackers
American football safeties
Clemson Tigers football players
Las Vegas Raiders players
Seattle Seahawks players